The Luluabourg Constitution was the second constitution of the Democratic Republic of the Congo. Functional from 1 August 1964 until November 1965, it was meant to replace the basic law (Loi Fondamentale) that had been provisionally enacted when independence was declared in 1960. Unlike its predecessor, the Luluabourg Constitution featured a strong executive presidency and carefully delineated federalism between the central government and the provinces. It also formalized the adoption of the name "Democratic Republic of the Congo", succeeding the name "Republic of the Congo".

Background 
As was agreed upon by the participants in the Belgo-Congolese Round Table Conference in 1960, a formal constitution was to be agreed upon by the Congolese within three to four years of independence.

Summary 
The Luluabourg Constitution was mostly a compensation for what its authors perceived to be the shortfalls of the Loi Fondamentale. Its principal features were a centralized and strengthened executive and a punctilious separation of responsibilities between the central and provincial governments.

National flag and state name 
The constitution formally changed the name of the country from "Republic of the Congo" to "Democratic Republic of the Congo" and adopted a new national flag.

Presidency 
According to the constitution, the president "determines and directs the policy of the state" and "establishes the framework of government action, supervises its application, and informs Parliament of its development".

The president was to be selected by an electoral college composed of members of Parliament, members from every provincial assembly, and several delegates from the capital with the number of them being determined by how much representation they would be accorded to in Parliament based on population. The capital delegates and parliamentary delegates would meet in the capital to cast their vote, while the provincial assembly electors would do the same from their respective provincial capitals. All presidential candidates had to be at least 40 years of age. The president was to be chosen by the candidate with a simple majority. If this was not achieved on the first two ballots, then the candidate with a plurality on the third would become president.

Premiership 
The office of prime minister was retained, but its functions and responsibilities were largely reduced. The prime minister and all other cabinet ministers were to be named and revoked either individually or collectively by the president.

Nationality 
Article 6 restricted Congolese nationality solely to persons whose ancestors were a part of an ethnic group that had lived in the Congo before 18 October 1908. This rule could be circumvented if a person submitted a formal request to change their nationality within 12 months of the promulgation of the constitution.

Effects and criticisms 
The Luluabourg Constitution denied citizenship to most Rwandan immigrants in the Congo. Marcel Bisukiro, a former government minister, criticised it as discriminatory.

Citations

References 

 
 
 
 

1964 in the Democratic Republic of the Congo
1965 in the Democratic Republic of the Congo
Defunct constitutions
1964 documents